I figli di nessuno may refer to:
 Nobody's Children (1951 film) (Italian:I figli di nessuno), a French-Italian melodrama film
 I figli di nessuno (1974 film), an Italian drama film